Melina Ayres (born 13 April 1999) is an Australian football (soccer) player, who currently plays for Melbourne Victory. She has previously played for Melbourne City.

WNPL 
In 2017, Ayres signed for her junior club South Melbourne FC after spending the previous WNPL Victoria season at Alamein FC. Ayres went on to sign for South Melbourne the following year.

Club career

Melbourne City, 2015–2017
In September 2015 at age 16, Ayres signed with Melbourne City for the 2015–16 season playing primarily in a striker position. She scored her first goal for the club during injury time of the team's inaugural match against Sydney FC solidifying the 6–0 win.

Melbourne Victory, 2017–
On 22 September, Ayres joined Melbourne Victory on a one-year deal. Highlights of her 2017/2018 season include a stunning goal against Melbourne City FC in round 11 when she won the ball from Alanna Kennedy and chipped Matildas goalkeeper Lydia Williams from close to halfway. Just one week earlier, Ayres scored another cracker of a strike against ladder leaders Brisbane Roar. With no clear options on hand, Ayres hit a right foot rocket past Matildas goalkeeper Mackenzie Arnold into the top right bin, leaving the keeper with no chance. In October 2020, Ayres signed a three-year extension with Melbourne Victory.

Breiðablik 2022
In April 2022, Ayres joined Breiðablik of the Icelandic Besta-deild kvenna on a loan from Melbourne Victory.

International career
Ayres played in Malaysia for the under-16 national team. Ayres was called up to the Australian under-20 squad for the 2016 AFF Women's Championship in July 2016 held in Myanmar.

Personal life
Ayres is currently studying a Bachelor of Environmental Science at Deakin University.

Honours

Individual 
 Women's National Premier League Golden Boot: (24 goals) 2016
 Women's National Premier League Golden Boot: (40 goals) 2017

See also
 Women's soccer in Australia

References

External links
 Melbourne City player profile 
 

1999 births
Living people
Australian women's soccer players
Women's association football forwards
Melbourne City FC (A-League Women) players
Melbourne Victory FC (A-League Women) players
A-League Women players
Breiðablik women's football players
Úrvalsdeild kvenna (football) players
Soccer players from Melbourne
Australian expatriate women's soccer players
Expatriate women's footballers in Iceland
Australian expatriate sportspeople in Iceland